Stanley Ann Dunham (November 29, 1942 – November 7, 1995) was an American anthropologist who specialized in the economic anthropology and rural development of Indonesia. She is the mother of Barack Obama, the 44th president of the United States. Dunham was known as Stanley Ann Dunham through high school, then as Ann Dunham, Ann Obama, Ann Soetoro, a.k.a. Ann Sutoro, and resumed her maiden name, Ann Dunham, later in life.

Born in Wichita, Kansas, Dunham studied at the East–West Center and at the University of Hawaiʻi at Mānoa in Honolulu, where she attained a bachelor of arts degree in anthropology (1967), and later received master of arts (1974) and PhD (1992) degrees, also in anthropology. She also attended the University of Washington in Seattle from 1961 to 1962. Interested in craftsmanship, weaving, and the role of women in cottage industries, Dunham's research focused on women's work on the island of Java and blacksmithing in Indonesia. To address the problem of poverty in rural villages, she created microcredit programs while working as a consultant for the United States Agency for International Development. Dunham was also employed by the Ford Foundation in Jakarta and she consulted with the Asian Development Bank in Gujranwala, Pakistan. Towards the latter part of her life, she worked with Bank Rakyat Indonesia, where she helped apply her research to the largest microfinance program in the world.

After her son was elected president, interest renewed in Dunham's work: the University of Hawaiʻi held a symposium about her research; an exhibition of Dunham's Indonesian batik textile collection toured the United States; and in December 2009, Duke University Press published Surviving against the Odds: Village Industry in Indonesia, a book based on Dunham's original 1992 dissertation. Janny Scott, an author and former New York Times reporter, published a biography of her titled A Singular Woman in 2011. Posthumous interest has also led to the creation of the Ann Dunham Soetoro Endowment in the Anthropology Department at the University of Hawaiʻi at Mānoa, as well as the Ann Dunham Soetoro Graduate Fellowships, intended to fund students associated with the East–West Center in Honolulu, Hawaii.

In an interview, Barack Obama referred to his mother as "the dominant figure in my formative years ... The values she taught me continue to be my touchstone when it comes to how I go about the world of politics."

Early life
Dunham was born on November 29, 1942, at St. Francis Hospital in Wichita, Kansas, the only child of Madelyn Lee Payne and Stanley Armour Dunham. She was of predominantly English ancestry, with some Scottish, Welsh, Irish, German and Swiss. Wild Bill Hickok is her sixth cousin, five times removed. Ancestry.com announced on July 30, 2012, after using a combination of old documents and yDNA analysis, that Dunham's mother was descended from John Punch, an enslaved African man who lived in seventeenth-century colonial Virginia.

Her parents were born in Kansas and met in Wichita, where they married on May 5, 1940. After the attack on Pearl Harbor, her father joined the United States Army and her mother worked at a Boeing plant in Wichita. According to Dunham, she was named after her father because he wanted a son, though her relatives doubt this story and her maternal uncle recalled that her mother named Dunham after her favorite actress Bette Davis' character in the film In This Our Life because she thought Stanley, as a girl's name, sounded sophisticated. As a child and teenager she was known as Stanley. Other children teased her about her name. Nonetheless, she used it through high school, "apologizing for it each time she introduced herself in a new town." By the time Dunham began attending college, she was known by her middle name, Ann, instead. After World War II, Dunham's family moved from Wichita to California while her father attended the University of California, Berkeley. In 1948, they moved to Ponca City, Oklahoma, and from there to Vernon, Texas, and then to El Dorado, Kansas. In 1955, the family moved to Seattle, Washington, where her father was employed as a furniture salesman and her mother worked as vice president of a bank. They lived in an apartment complex in the Wedgwood neighborhood where she attended Nathan Eckstein Junior High School.

In 1957, Dunham's family moved to Mercer Island, an Eastside suburb of Seattle. Dunham's parents wanted their 13-year-old daughter to attend the newly opened Mercer Island High School. At the school, teachers Val Foubert and Jim Wichterman taught the importance of challenging social norms and questioning authority to the young Dunham, and she took the lessons to heart: "She felt she didn't need to date or marry or have children." One classmate remembered her as "intellectually way more mature than we were and a little bit ahead of her time, in an off-center way", and a high school friend described her as knowledgeable and progressive: "If you were concerned about something going wrong in the world, Stanley would know about it first. We were liberals before we knew what liberals were." Another called her "the original feminist". She went through high school "reading beatnik poets and French existentialists".

Family life and marriages

On August 21, 1959, Hawaii became the 50th state to be admitted into the Union. Dunham's parents sought business opportunities in the new state, and after graduating from high school in 1960, Dunham and her family moved to Honolulu. Dunham enrolled at the University of Hawaii at Mānoa.

First marriage
While attending a Russian language class, Dunham met Barack Obama Sr., the school's first African student. At the age of 23, Obama Sr. had come to Hawaii to pursue his education, leaving behind a pregnant wife, Kezia, and their infant son in his home town of Nyang'oma Kogelo in Kenya. Dunham and Obama Sr. were married on the Hawaiian island of Maui on February 2, 1961, despite parental opposition from both families. Dunham was three months pregnant. Obama Sr. eventually informed Dunham about his first marriage in Kenya but claimed he was divorced. Years later she discovered this was false. Obama Sr.'s first wife, Kezia, later said she had granted her consent for him to marry a second wife in keeping with Luo customs.

On August 4, 1961, at the age of 18, Dunham gave birth to her first child, Barack Obama, in Honolulu. Friends in the state of Washington recall her visiting with her month-old baby in 1961.
She studied at the University of Washington from September 1961 to June 1962, and lived as a single mother in the Capitol Hill neighborhood of Seattle with her son while her husband continued his studies in Hawaii. When Obama Sr. graduated from the University of Hawaii in June 1962, he left for Cambridge, Massachusetts, where he began graduate study at Harvard University in fall 1962. Dunham returned to Honolulu and resumed her undergraduate education at the University of Hawaii with the spring semester in January 1963. During this time, her parents helped her raise the young Barack. Dunham filed for divorce in January 1964, which Obama Sr. did not contest.

Second marriage
It was at the East–West Center that Dunham met Lolo Soetoro, a Javanese surveyor who had come to Honolulu in September 1962 on an East–West Center grant to study geography at the University of Hawaii. Soetoro graduated from the University of Hawaii with an MA in geography in June 1964. In 1965, Soetoro and Dunham were married in Hawaii, and in 1966, Soetoro returned to Indonesia. Dunham graduated from the University of Hawaii with a B.A. in anthropology on August 6, 1967, and moved in October the same year with her six-year-old son to Jakarta, Indonesia, to rejoin her husband.

In Indonesia, Soetoro worked first as a low-paid topographical surveyor for the Indonesian government, and later in the government relations office of Union Oil Company. The family first lived at 16 Kyai Haji Ramli Tengah Street in a newly built neighborhood in the Menteng Dalam administrative village of the Tebet subdistrict in South Jakarta for two and a half years, with her son attending the nearby Indonesian-language Santo Fransiskus Asisi (St. Francis of Assisi) Catholic School for 1st, 2nd, and part of 3rd grade, then in 1970 moved two miles north to 22 Taman Amir Hamzah Street in the Matraman Dalam neighborhood in the Pegangsaan administrative village of the Menteng subdistrict in Central Jakarta, with her son attending the Indonesian-language government-run Besuki School one and half miles east in the exclusive Menteng administrative village of the Menteng subdistrict for part of 3rd grade and for 4th grade. On August 15, 1970, Soetoro and Dunham had a daughter, Maya Kassandra Soetoro.

In Indonesia, Dunham enriched her son's education with correspondence courses in English, recordings of Mahalia Jackson, and speeches by Martin Luther King Jr. In 1971, she sent the young Obama back to Hawaii to attend Punahou School starting in 5th grade rather than having him stay in Indonesia with her. Madelyn Dunham's job at the Bank of Hawaii, where she had worked her way up over a decade from clerk to becoming one of its first two female vice presidents in 1970, helped pay the steep tuition, with some assistance from a scholarship.

A year later, in August 1972, Dunham and her daughter moved back to Hawaii to rejoin her son and begin graduate study in anthropology at the University of Hawaii at Manoa. Dunham's graduate work was supported by an Asia Foundation grant from August 1972 to July 1973 and by an East–West Center Technology and Development Institute grant from August 1973 to December 1978.

Dunham completed her coursework at the University of Hawaii for an M.A. in anthropology in December 1974, and after having spent three years in Hawaii, Dunham, accompanied by her daughter Maya, returned to Indonesia in 1975 to do anthropological field work. Her son chose not to go with them back to Indonesia, preferring to finish high school at Punahou School in Honolulu while living with his grandparents. Lolo Soetoro and Dunham divorced on November 5, 1980; Lolo Soetoro married Erna Kustina in 1980 and had two children, a son, Yusuf Aji Soetoro (born 1981), and daughter, Rahayu Nurmaida Soetoro (born 1987). Lolo Soetoro died, age 52, on March 2, 1987, due to liver failure.

Dunham was not estranged from either ex-husband and encouraged her children to feel connected to their fathers.

Professional life
From January 1968 to December 1969, Dunham taught English and was an assistant director of the Lembaga Persahabatan Indonesia Amerika (LIA)–the Indonesia-America Friendship Institute at 9 Teuku Umar Street in the Gondangdia administrative village of the Menteng subdistrict in Central Jakarta–which was subsidized by the United States government. From January 1970 to August 1972, Dunham taught English and was a department head and a director of the Lembaga Pendidikan dan Pengembangan Manajemen (LPPM)–the Institute of Management Education and Development at 9 Menteng Raya Street in the Kebon Sirih administrative village of the Menteng subdistrict in Central Jakarta.

From 1968 to 1972, Dunham was a co-founder and active member of the Ganesha Volunteers (Indonesian Heritage Society) at the National Museum in Jakarta. From 1972 to 1975, Dunham was crafts instructor (in weaving, batik, and dye) at the Bishop Museum in Honolulu.

Dunham then had a career in rural development, championing women's work and microcredit for the world's poor and worked with leaders from organizations supporting Indonesian human rights, women's rights, and grass-roots development.

In March 1977, Dunham, under the supervision of agricultural economics professor Leon A. Mears, developed and taught a short lecture course at the Faculty of Economics of the University of Indonesia (FEUI) in Jakarta for staff members of BAPPENAS (Badan Perencanaan Pembangunan Nasional)—the Indonesian National Development Planning Agency.

From June 1977 through September 1978, Dunham carried out research on village industries in the Daerah Istimewa Yogyakarta (DIY)—the Yogyakarta Special Region within Central Java in Indonesia under a student grant from the East–West Center. As a weaver herself, Dunham was interested in village industries, and moved to Yogyakarta City, the center of Javanese handicrafts.

In May and June 1978, Dunham was a short-term consultant in the office of the International Labour Organization (ILO) in Jakarta, writing recommendations on village industries and other non-agricultural enterprises for the Indonesian government's third five-year development plan (REPELITA III).

From October 1978 to December 1980, Dunham was a rural industries consultant in Central Java on the Indonesian Ministry of Industry's Provincial Development Program (PDP I), funded by USAID in Jakarta and implemented through Development Alternatives, Inc. (DAI).

From January 1981 to November 1984, Dunham was the program officer for women and employment in the Ford Foundation's Southeast Asia regional office in Jakarta. While at the Ford Foundation, she developed a model of microfinance which is now the standard in Indonesia, a country that is a world leader in micro-credit systems. Peter Geithner, father of Tim Geithner (who later became U.S. Secretary of the Treasury in her son's administration), was head of the foundation's Asia grant-making at that time.

From May to November 1986 and from August to November 1987, Dunham was a cottage industries development consultant for the Agricultural Development Bank of Pakistan (ADBP) under the Gujranwala Integrated Rural Development Project (GADP). The credit component of the project was implemented in the Gujranwala district of the Punjab province of Pakistan with funding from the Asian Development Bank and IFAD, with the credit component implemented through Louis Berger International, Inc. Dunham worked closely with the Lahore office of the Punjab Small Industries Corporation (PSIC).

From January 1988 to 1995, Dunham was a consultant and research coordinator for Indonesia's oldest bank, Bank Rakyat Indonesia (BRI) in Jakarta, with her work funded by USAID and the World Bank. In March 1993, Dunham was a research and policy coordinator for Women's World Banking (WWB) in New York. She helped WWB manage the Expert Group Meeting on Women and Finance in New York in January 1994, and helped the WWB take prominent roles in the UN's Fourth World Conference on Women held September 4–15, 1995 in Beijing, and in the UN regional conferences and NGO forums that preceded it.

On August 9, 1992, she was awarded PhD in anthropology from the University of Hawaii, under the supervision of Prof. Alice G. Dewey, with a 1,043-page dissertation titled Peasant blacksmithing in Indonesia: surviving and thriving against all odds. Anthropologist Michael Dove described the dissertation as "a classic, in-depth, on-the-ground anthropological study of a 1,200-year-old industry". According to Dove, Dunham's dissertation challenged popular perceptions regarding economically and politically marginalized groups, and countered the notions that the roots of poverty lie with the poor themselves and that cultural differences are responsible for the gap between less-developed countries and the industrialized West. According to Dove, Dunham
found that the villagers she studied in Central Java had many of the same economic needs, beliefs and aspirations as the most capitalist of Westerners. Village craftsmen were "keenly interested in profits", she wrote, and entrepreneurship was "in plentiful supply in rural Indonesia", having been "part of the traditional culture" there for a millennium.Based on these observations, Dr. Soetoro concluded that underdevelopment in these communities resulted from a scarcity of capital, the allocation of which was a matter of politics, not culture. Antipoverty programs that ignored this reality had the potential, perversely, of exacerbating inequality because they would only reinforce the power of elites. As she wrote in her dissertation, "many government programs inadvertently foster stratification by channeling resources through village officials", who then used the money to strengthen their own status further.

Dunham produced a large amount of professional papers that are held in collections of the National Anthropological Archives (NAA). Her daughter donated a collection of them that is categorized as the S. Ann Dunham papers, 1965-2013. This collection contains case studies, correspondence, field notebooks, lectures, photographs, reports, research files, research proposals, surveys, and floppy disks documenting her dissertation research on blacksmithing, as well as her professional work as a consultant for organizations such as the Ford Foundation and the Bank Raykat Indonesia (BRI). They are housed at the Smithsonian National Museum of Natural History.

Her field notes have been digitized and, in 2020, Smithsonian Magazine noted that an effort had been established for a project to transcribe them. Public participation in the transcription project was announced at the same time.

Illness and death
In late 1994, Dunham was living and working in Indonesia. One night, during dinner at a friend's house in Jakarta, she experienced stomach pain. A visit to a local physician led to an initial diagnosis of indigestion. Dunham returned to the United States in early 1995 and was examined at the Memorial Sloan–Kettering Cancer Center in New York City and diagnosed with uterine cancer. By this time, the cancer had spread to her ovaries. She moved back to Hawaii to live near her widowed mother and died on November 7, 1995, 22 days short of her 53rd birthday. Following a memorial service at the University of Hawaii, Obama and his sister spread their mother's ashes in the Pacific Ocean at Lanai Lookout on the south side of Oahu. Obama scattered the ashes of his grandmother Madelyn Dunham in the same spot on December 23, 2008, weeks after his election to the presidency.

Obama talked about Dunham's death in a 30-second campaign advertisement ("Mother") arguing for health care reform. The ad featured a photograph of Dunham holding a young Obama in her arms as Obama talks about her last days worrying about expensive medical bills. The topic also came up in a 2007 speech in Santa Barbara:

I remember my mother. She was 52 years old when she died of ovarian cancer, and you know what she was thinking about in the last months of her life? She wasn't thinking about getting well. She wasn't thinking about coming to terms with her own mortality. She had been diagnosed just as she was transitioning between jobs. And she wasn't sure whether insurance was going to cover the medical expenses because they might consider this a preexisting condition. I remember just being heartbroken, seeing her struggle through the paperwork and the medical bills and the insurance forms. So, I have seen what it's like when somebody you love is suffering because of a broken health care system. And it's wrong. It's not who we are as a people.

Dunham's employer-provided health insurance covered most of the costs of her medical treatment, leaving her to pay the deductible and uncovered expenses, which came to several hundred dollars per month. Her employer-provided disability insurance denied her claims for uncovered expenses because the insurance company said her cancer was a preexisting condition.

Posthumous interest
In September 2008, the University of Hawaii at Mānoa held a symposium about Dunham. In December 2009, Duke University Press published a version of Dunham's dissertation titled Surviving against the Odds: Village Industry in Indonesia. The book was revised and edited by Dunham's graduate advisor, Alice G. Dewey, and Nancy I. Cooper. Dunham's daughter, Maya Soetoro-Ng, wrote the foreword for the book. In his afterword, Boston University anthropologist Robert W. Hefner describes Dunham's research as "prescient" and her legacy as "relevant today for anthropology, Indonesian studies, and engaged scholarship". The book was launched at the 2009 annual meeting of the American Anthropological Association in Philadelphia with a special Presidential Panel on Dunham's work; The 2009 meeting was taped by C-SPAN.

In 2009, an exhibition of Dunham's Javanese batik textile collection (A Lady Found a Culture in its Cloth: Barack Obama's Mother and Indonesian Batiks) toured six museums in the United States, finishing the tour at the Textile Museum of Washington, D.C., in August. Early in her life, Dunham explored her interest in the textile arts as a weaver, creating wall hangings for her own enjoyment. After moving to Indonesia, she was attracted to the striking textile art of the batik and began to collect a variety of different fabrics.

In December 2010 Dunham was awarded the Bintang Jasa Utama, Indonesia's highest civilian award; the Bintang Jasa is awarded at three levels, and is presented to those individuals who have made notable civic and cultural contributions.

A lengthy major biography of Dunham by former New York Times reporter Janny Scott, titled A Singular Woman, was published in 2011.

The University of Hawaii Foundation has established the Ann Dunham Soetoro Endowment, which supports a faculty position housed in the Anthropology Department at the University of Hawaiʻi at Mānoa, and the Ann Dunham Soetoro Graduate Fellowships, providing funding for students associated with the East–West Center (EWC) in Honolulu, Hawaii.

In 2010 the Stanley Ann Dunham Scholarship was established for young women graduating from Mercer Island High School, Ann's alma mater. In its first six years the scholarship fund has awarded eleven college scholarships.

On January 1, 2012, President Obama and his family visited an exhibition of his mother's anthropological work on display at the East–West Center.

Filmmaker Vivian Norris's feature length biographical film of Ann Dunham entitled Obama Mama (La mère d'Obama-French title) premiered on May 31, 2014, as part of the 40th annual Seattle International Film Festival, not far from where Dunham grew up on Mercer Island.

Personal beliefs
In his 1995 memoir Dreams from My Father, Barack Obama wrote, "My mother's confidence in needlepoint virtues depended on a faith I didn't possess... In a land [Indonesia] where fatalism remained a necessary tool for enduring hardship ... she was a lonely witness for secular humanism, a soldier for New Deal, Peace Corps, position-paper liberalism." In his 2006 book The Audacity of Hope Obama wrote, "I was not raised in a religious household ... My mother's own experiences ... only reinforced this inherited skepticism. Her memories of the Christians who populated her youth were not fond ones ... And yet for all her professed secularism, my mother was in many ways the most spiritually awakened person that I've ever known." "Religion for her was "just one of the many ways—and not necessarily the best way—that man attempted to control the unknowable and understand the deeper truths about our lives," Obama wrote.

Dunham's best friend in high school, Maxine Box, said that Dunham "touted herself as an atheist, and it was something she'd read about and could argue. She was always challenging and arguing and comparing. She was already thinking about things that the rest of us hadn't."  On the other hand, Dunham's daughter, Maya Soetoro-Ng, when asked later if her mother was an atheist, said, "I wouldn't have called her an atheist. She was an agnostic. She basically gave us all the good books—the Bible, the Hindu Upanishads and the Buddhist scripture, the Tao Te Ching—and wanted us to recognize that everyone has something beautiful to contribute." "Jesus, she felt, was a wonderful example. But she felt that a lot of Christians behaved in un-Christian ways."

In a 2007 speech, Obama contrasted the beliefs of his mother to those of her parents, and commented on her spirituality and skepticism: "My mother, whose parents were nonpracticing Baptists and Methodists, was one of the most spiritual souls I ever knew. But she had a healthy skepticism of religion as an institution."

Obama also described his own beliefs in relation to the religious upbringing of his mother and father:

Publications

References

References

Further reading
 

Obama family
American women anthropologists
American women social scientists
American feminists
American humanists
University of Hawaiʻi at Mānoa alumni
University of Washington alumni
People from Honolulu
People from Mercer Island, Washington
People from Wichita, Kansas
American people of English descent
American people of German descent
American people of Irish descent
American people of Scottish descent
American people of Swiss descent
American people of Welsh descent
American expatriates in Indonesia
American expatriates in Pakistan
Deaths from cancer in Hawaii
Deaths from uterine cancer
Mothers of presidents of the United States
1942 births
1995 deaths
20th-century American women scientists
20th-century American scientists
Mercer Island High School alumni
20th-century American anthropologists
American people of African descent